Perkiomen Bridge Hotel, also known as Lane's Hotel, is a historic hotel complex located adjacent to the Perkiomen Bridge at Collegeville, Montgomery County, Pennsylvania. The original building was built about 1706 (some sources say 1689), with later expansions in the 18th, 19th, and 20th centuries.  It consists of a c. 1800, three-story, six bay gable roofed stuccoed brownstone building with two-story porches and a low, gable roofed wing that is likely the oldest portion.  Attached to this is a low, one-story kitchen wing and enclosed porch dated to about 1930.  The building was auctioned in 2010.

It was added to the National Register of Historic Places in 1985.

References

Hotel buildings on the National Register of Historic Places in Pennsylvania
Hotel buildings completed in 1706
Hotel buildings completed in 1800
Buildings and structures in Montgomery County, Pennsylvania
1706 establishments in Pennsylvania
National Register of Historic Places in Montgomery County, Pennsylvania